Nechako Canyon Protected Area is a protected area of the BC Parks system, located on the Nechako River between Knewstubb Lake (formed by the Kenny Dam of the Nechako Diversion) and Cheslatta Falls at the mouth of the Cheslatta River. The Nechako Canyon, also known as the Grand Canyon of the Nechako, is carved into a lava plateau and features erosive formations such as rock walls, overhanging cliffs, pinnacles and other formations, and the protected area includes Cheslatta Falls.

References

External links

Provincial parks of British Columbia
Nechako Country
Year of establishment missing